Quelbourne: Land of the Silver Mist is a 1989 role-playing game supplement for Rolemaster published by Iron Crown Enterprises.

Contents
Quelbourne: Land of the Silver Mist is a supplement in which the setting is in the north of Kulthea.

Publication history
Quelbourne: Land of the Silver Mist was written by Daniel Henley and Margaret Henley, with a cover by Tony Roberts, and illustrations by Dan Carroll and Jennell Jaquays, and was published by Iron Crown Enterprises in 1989 as a 72-page book.

Reception
Oliver Johnson reviewed Quellbourne for Games International magazine, and gave it 2 1/2 stars out of 5, and stated that "There is too much of the usual fantastic 'and here's the Moot Hall and here's the Herbalists' variety in the major town, Kelfal's Landing, not enough of a strong sustained plot to get the referee and players through a session."

Notes

References

Role-playing game supplements introduced in 1989
Rolemaster supplements
Shadow World (role-playing game)